WEKY (1340 AM) is a radio station broadcasting a classic hits format. Licensed to Richmond, Kentucky, United States, the station serves the Lexington Metro Area.   The station is currently owned by Wallingford Communications, LLC and features programming from ABC Radio.

History
On July 7, 2017, WEKY changed its format from news/talk to classic hits, branded as "Y92.5".  (info taken from stationintel.com)

References

External links
Wallingford Media Group stations

EKY